Joaquim Adriano José Conceição (born 8 April 1942) is a former Portuguese footballer who played as a defender.

External links 
 
 

1942 births
Living people
Portuguese footballers
Association football defenders
Primeira Liga players
Vitória F.C. players
Portugal international footballers
Place of birth missing (living people)